The 2016 Boys' Youth NORCECA Volleyball Championship is the tenth edition of the bi-annual volleyball tournament. It will be held in La Habana, Cuba from 24 June to 29 June. Eight countries will be competing in the tournament.

Pool composition

Pool standing procedure
 Number of matches won
 Match points
 Points ratio
 Sets ratio
 Result of the last match between the tied teams

Match won 3–0: 5 match points for the winner, 0 match points for the loser
Match won 3–1: 4 match points for the winner, 1 match point for the loser
Match won 3–2: 3 match points for the winner, 2 match points for the loser

Preliminary round
All times are in Eastern Daylight Time - (UTC−04:00)

Group A

Group B

Final round

Bracket

Quarterfinals

5th–8th Classification

Semifinals

7th place

5th place

3rd place

Final

Finals standing

References

2016 Boys' U-19
NORCECA
2016 in Cuban sport
International volleyball competitions hosted by Cuba